The 2009 Stanley Cup playoffs of the National Hockey League began on April 15, 2009, after the 2008–09 regular season. The sixteen teams that qualified, eight from each conference (the winner of each of the three divisions plus the five teams with highest point totals from the teams remaining), played a best-of-seven series for the conference quarterfinals, semifinals, and championships, and then the conference champions played a best-of-seven series for the Stanley Cup. The Columbus Blue Jackets made their first appearance in the playoffs in their nine-year history. Previously they had been the only franchise never to have made the playoffs. Also, home teams set a record by going 13–2 in the openers of all the series combined.
There were no playoff games played in the Province of Ontario as this was the first time that the modern Ottawa Senators and the Toronto Maple Leafs both missed the playoffs in the same year.  This was the most recent time that the Carolina Hurricanes were in the playoffs until 2019.

The Finals ended on June 12, 2009, with the Pittsburgh Penguins defeating the Detroit Red Wings four games to three to win the championship.  They became just the second team, after the 1971 Montreal Canadiens, to win the championship after losing the first two games of the series on the road.

Playoff seeds
The top eight teams in each conference qualified for the playoffs. The top three seeds in each conference were awarded to the division winners; while the five remaining spots were awarded to the highest finishers in their respective conferences.

Eastern Conference
Boston Bruins, Northeast Division champions, Eastern Conference regular season champions – 116 points
Washington Capitals, Southeast Division champions – 108 points
New Jersey Devils, Atlantic Division champions – 106 points
Pittsburgh Penguins – 99 points (45 wins)
Philadelphia Flyers – 99 points (44 wins)
Carolina Hurricanes – 97 points
New York Rangers – 95 points
Montreal Canadiens – 93 points

Western Conference
San Jose Sharks, Pacific Division champions, Western Conference regular season champions, President's Trophy winners – 117 points
Detroit Red Wings, Central Division champions – 112 points
Vancouver Canucks, Northwest Division champions – 100 points
Chicago Blackhawks – 104 points
Calgary Flames – 98 points
St. Louis Blues – 92 points (41 wins, 8 points head-to-head vs. Columbus)
Columbus Blue Jackets – 92 points (41 wins, 2 points head-to-head vs. St. Louis)
Anaheim Ducks – 91 points

Playoff bracket
In each round, the highest remaining seed in each conference was matched against the lowest remaining seed. The higher-seeded team is awarded home ice advantage, which gave them a possible maximum of four games on their home ice, with the lower-seeded team getting a possible maximum of three. In the Stanley Cup Finals, home ice is determined based on regular season points. Each best-of-seven series followed a 2–2–1–1–1 format. This meant that the higher-seeded team had home ice for games one and two, and if necessary, five and seven, while the lower-seeded team had home ice for games three, four and, if necessary, six.

Conference Quarterfinals

Eastern Conference Quarterfinals

(1) Boston Bruins vs. (8) Montreal Canadiens

For an NHL-record 32nd time, the Bruins and Canadiens faced each other in the playoffs. The Boston Bruins entered the playoffs after finishing the regular season with the best record in the Eastern Conference with 116 points. The Montreal Canadiens qualified for the postseason as the eighth seed with 93 points, winning the tiebreaker over the Florida Panthers based on the season series (six points to three).

Boston swept Montreal, four games to none, scoring at least four goals in each win. With the score tied 2–2 entering the third period of game one, Bruins captain Zdeno Chara scored a power play goal at 11:15 and Phil Kessel added an empty net score in the closing seconds to clinch the victory. Boston scored three power play goals, including two from Marc Savard, en route to a 5–1 victory in game two. Game three resembled game one in that both teams fought to a 2–2 tie midway through the game, but like the first contest the Bruins scored the go-ahead winning goal again. This time it was Michael Ryder at 17:21 in the second period. Montreal scored in the first minute of game four off the stick of Andrei Kostitsyn, but Boston went on to dominate the rest of the game, grabbing two goals from Ryder in a 4–1 victory, to win the series.

(2) Washington Capitals vs. (7) New York Rangers

The Washington Capitals entered the playoffs as the second seed in the Eastern Conference after winning the Southeast Division with 108 points. The New York Rangers earned the seventh seed with 95 points. The teams met in the playoffs four times previously, with each winning two series. They last met in the 1994 Eastern Conference Semifinals, which the Rangers won in five games.

The Capitals overcame a three games to one deficit to win the series. The Rangers won the first game by a 4–3 score, with Brandon Dubinsky scoring the game winner at 11:43 in the third period. Capitals head coach Bruce Boudreau benched starting goaltender Jose Theodore and replaced him with Simeon Varlamov for game two, after Theodore allowed four goals on just 21 shots. The goaltending change was not immediately effective as New York netminder Henrik Lundqvist stopped all 35 Washington shots to give the Rangers a 1–0 victory (with Ryan Callahan providing the only tally) in the following game. Varlamov responded in game three by stopping all 33 Ranger shots, and Alexander Semin scored two goals, to lead the Capitals to a 4–0 victory. However, Lundqvist stopped 38 of 39 shots, including 10 of 11 from the stick of Alexander Ovechkin, to give the Rangers a 2–1 victory in game four. The Capitals limited the Rangers to just 20 shots to win 4–0 in Game five. Fourth liner Matt Bradley scored two goals in the game and Lundquist was pulled after allowing four goals on 14 shots. Washington erupted in game six to score five goals, including powerplay markers from Mike Green and Ovechkin, for a 5–3 victory. After game six, the league suspended Capitals forward Donald Brashear for both a pre-game altercation with Rangers forward Colton Orr and what was ruled to be a late hit on Blair Betts, in which the Rangers center suffered an orbital eye socket fracture. Sergei Fedorov scored the game-winning goal 15:01 into the third period in game seven to give the Capitals a 2–1 victory and eliminate the Rangers for their first playoff series victory since reaching the Stanley Cup final in 1998.

(3) New Jersey Devils vs. (6) Carolina Hurricanes

The New Jersey Devils entered the playoffs as the third seed in the Eastern Conference after winning the Atlantic Division with 106 points. The Carolina Hurricanes earned the sixth seed with 97 points. These teams met three times previously in the playoffs, with the Hurricanes winning two series. They last met in the 2006 Eastern Conference Semifinals, with the Hurricanes winning in five games.

The Hurricanes defeated the Devils in seven games. New Jersey won the first game with goaltender Martin Brodeur stopping 18 of 19 shots and the Devils' top line playing phenomenally, with Zach Parise and Patrik Elias coming up with goals. . In game two, Tim Gleason scored 2:40 into overtime for his first goal of the season to give Carolina a 2–1 victory. The game was a goaltending battle that saw Brodeur and Cam Ward each stop over 30 shots Game 3 also went into overtime, but this time the Devils prevailed, 3–2, with Travis Zajac scoring at 4:48 into the extra period. It appeared that game four would also go into overtime, but it ended with an epic conclusion. Carolina led 3–0, but New Jersey rallied to tie the game in the third. Jussi Jokinen proved to be the hero, as he scored on a deflection with 0.2 seconds remaining in regulation to give the Hurricanes a 4–3 victory. This goal was the latest game winning regulation goal in Stanley Cup Playoff history. The next two games of the series were shutouts: Brodeur stopped 44 shots in a 1–0 victory for the Devils in game five (with David Clarkson providing the game's sole goal), while Cam Ward stopped 28 shots and Eric Staal scored twice in a 4–0 victory for Carolina in game six. The Hurricanes were behind for much of game seven but scored two goals inside the last 1:20 of the third period, one by Jokinen and the other by Staal, to win the contest 4–3 and eliminate the Devils.

(4) Pittsburgh Penguins vs. (5) Philadelphia Flyers

The Pittsburgh Penguins and Philadelphia Flyers qualified for the playoffs as the fourth and fifth seeds in the Eastern Conference, respectively. Both finished the regular season with 99 points, but the Penguins won the tiebreaker based on total wins (45 to 44). The Penguins and Flyers had previously met in the previous season's Eastern Conference Final, with the Penguins winning in five games. It was the Penguins first win against the Flyers, having lost against them in three previous series (1989, 1997 and 2000).

The Penguins defeated the Flyers in six games. Sidney Crosby scored a power play goal early in the first period of game one, sparking the Penguins to a 4–1 win against an undisciplined Flyers team that took 12 penalties. In game two, Bill Guerin scored two goals including the game-winner during a five-on-three power play at 18:29 in overtime to give Pittsburgh a 3–2 victory. The Flyers bounced back in game three with a 6–3 victory that featured two goals by Simon Gagne. Pittsburgh goaltender Marc-Andre Fleury stopped 45 shots and helped kill off nine Philadelphia power plays, while Tyler Kennedy scored the game winner, to give Pittsburgh a 3–1 win in Game 4. Flyers goaltender Martin Biron stopped all 28 shots, and Philadelphia got scoring from unlikely sources such as Arron Asham, to give the Flyers a 3–0 victory in game five. Then in game six, Philadelphia jumped to a 3–0 lead in the second period and appeared to be on their way to force a game seven. However, a fight between Philadelphia's Daniel Carcillo and Pittsburgh's Max Talbot reenergized the Penguins, who erupted to score five unanswered goals, including two by Crosby, to win the game and the series.

Western Conference Quarterfinals

(1) San Jose Sharks vs. (8) Anaheim Ducks

The series between the Sharks and Ducks was just the second time in NHL history that two California teams were facing each other in the playoffs. The first series was in 1969 between the Los Angeles Kings and the Oakland Seals. The San Jose Sharks entered the playoffs as the Presidents' Trophy winner, earning the NHL's best regular season record with 117 points. The Anaheim Ducks earned 91 points to clinch the eighth playoff seed in the Western Conference.

The Ducks defeated the Sharks in six games, to become just the second California team (after the 2000 Sharks over the St. Louis Blues) to eliminate a Presidents' Trophy winner in the first round of the playoffs. Anaheim goaltender Jonas Hiller earned two shutout victories in games one and four, stopping a total of 66 shots. Game one was deadlocked until a Scott Niedermayer powerplay goal broke the ice at 5:18 in the third, while game four was dominated by Anaheim and featured two goals from Bobby Ryan Hiller also stopped 42 out of 44 shots in game two, as Drew Miller picked up the game winner, and 36 out of 37 shots in a game six that saw the Ducks produce powerplay goals from Corey Perry and Teemu Selanne. In total, Hiller allowed only ten goals in the series. For the Sharks, Dan Boyle scored two goals in game three to give San Jose a 4–3 win in that contest, while Patrick Marleau scored the game-winning goal in game five to give the Sharks a 3–2 overtime victory. However, back in Anaheim for game six, the Ducks grabbed goals from big-name players like Selanne and Perry, dominating the Sharks to win the game 4–1, and eliminating the Sharks.

(2) Detroit Red Wings vs. (7) Columbus Blue Jackets

The Detroit Red Wings, the defending Stanley Cup Champions, entered the playoffs as the second overall seed in the Western Conference, having clinched the Central Division title with 112 points. The Columbus Blue Jackets qualified for the playoffs for the first time in franchise history, clinching the seventh seed with 92 points but lost the head-to-head tiebreaker with the St. Louis Blues. This was the first Western Conference playoff series played entirely within the Eastern Time Zone since the Red Wings played the Toronto Maple Leafs in the 1993 Norris Division Semifinals, and this proved to be the last ever occurrence, as both of these teams were realigned into the Eastern Conference prior to the start of the 2013–14 season.

The Red Wings swept the Blue Jackets in four games. Detroit scored four goals in each of the first three games of the series, while goaltender Chris Osgood only allowed two total goals out of 78 Columbus shots in those three games, including a shutout victory in game two. Jiri Hudler broke the ice at 10:48 in the second period for the game one win. Detroit picked up powerplay goals from Brian Rafalski, Niklas Kronwall, and Hudler in game two. Henrik Zetterberg scored twice in a game three victory

The fourth game proved to be the most competitive contest of the series. Nicklas Lidstrom scored a power play goal early in the first period to give the Red Wings the lead before Kristian Huselius tied the score about three minutes later on a power play goal of his own. Tomas Holmstrom and Dan Cleary then scored to give Detroit a 3–1 lead before the end of the opening period. Columbus fought to tie the score again at 5:38 of the second period with goals by Rick Nash and R. J. Umberger, but the Red Wings Marian Hossa answered with two consecutive goals to give his team a two-goal lead again. The Blue Jackets then rallied to tie the score, 5–5, by the closing minutes of the second period with scores by Kris Russell and Fredrik Modin. The third period remained scoreless until the closing minutes of regulation. With less than two minutes left, the Blue Jackets were called for too many men on the ice, which enabled Johan Franzen to score the series winning power play goal with 46.6 seconds remaining.

(3) Vancouver Canucks vs. (6) St. Louis Blues

The Vancouver Canucks entered the playoffs as the third overall seed in the Western Conference, having clinched the Northwest Division title with 100 points. The St. Louis Blues qualified for the playoffs for the first time since 2004, clinching the sixth seed with 92 points and winning the head-to-head tiebreaker over the Columbus Blue Jackets. This was the third meeting in the playoffs for these two teams, the Canucks winning both previous series. They last met in the 2003 Western Conference Quarterfinals, with the Canucks winning in seven games.

Vancouver swept St. Louis in four games, their first sweep of a best-of-seven series in franchise history, to move on to the second round. The Canucks held off the Blues in game one, winning 2–1 by gaining goals from Daniel Sedin and Sami Salo and killing off a long Blues five-on-three power play midway through the first period. Vancouver then shut out St. Louis in game two, 3–0, with goaltender Roberto Luongo stopping all 30 Blues shots and Mats Sundin providing the game-winning goal. The Blues were hoping to gain momentum when the series shifted to St. Louis for game three, but Vancouver held on to a 3–2 win, scoring three power play goals, with Mattias Ohlund, Sedin, and Steve Bernier providing the man-advantage tallies. In game four, Brad Boyes and David Perron helped St. Louis to tie the game after falling behind early. However, Alexandre Burrows scored with 18.9 seconds left in the first overtime period to give the Canucks a 3–2 victory and the four-game sweep.

(4) Chicago Blackhawks vs. (5) Calgary Flames

The Chicago Blackhawks finished the regular season in second place in the Central division with 104 points and thus entered the playoffs as the fourth-overall seed in the Western Conference. The Calgary Flames earned 98 points during the regular season to finish fifth-overall in the Western Conference. Chicago made the playoffs for the first time since 2002. The two teams met in the playoffs three times previously, with the Flames winning two series. They last met in the 1996 Western Conference Quarterfinals, with the Blackhawks winning in four games.

Chicago won the series over Calgary in six games, with the home team winning the first five games of the series. Martin Havlat scored the game-winning goal 12 seconds into overtime to win game one for the Blackhawks, 3–2. Then in game two, Chicago overcame a 2-goal deficit by scoring 3 goals in the second period, including a pair from Jonathan Toews, to win 3–2. When the series shifted to Calgary for game three, David Moss scored two goals to help the Flames earn a 4–2 victory. In game four, Calgary scored six goals, including two by each of their top stars Jarome Iginla and Olli Jokinen, to win 6–4. The Blackhawks responded in game five by exploding to a 5–1 victory, going up 3–0 after one period with goals from Brent Seabrook, Patrick Sharp, and Kris Versteeg, and limiting the Flames to 20 shots on goal. Chicago defeated Calgary by a score of 4–1 in game six to win the series, with Patrick Kane providing the early game winner and goaltender Nikolai Khabibulin stopping 43 out of 44 shots.

Conference Semifinals
For the first time since the 2001 playoffs, at least three Conference Semifinal series extended to seven games.

Eastern Conference Semifinals

(1) Boston Bruins vs. (6) Carolina Hurricanes

The was the fourth playoff meeting between these two teams, with the Bruins winning all three previous series. They last met in the 1999 Eastern Conference Quarterfinals, which Boston won in six games. The Carolina Hurricanes eliminated the Boston Bruins in seven games to advance to their first Eastern Conference Final since their Stanley Cup championship season in 2006. Marc Savard scored two goals to help give the Bruins a 4–1 victory in game one, but the Hurricanes won the next three games of the series. First, Carolina goaltender Cam Ward stopped all 36 shots and Matt Cullen provided a shorthanded marker in a 3–0 victory in game two. Next, Jussi Jokinen scored at 2:48 into overtime of game three to give the Hurricanes a 3–2 victory. In game four, Eric Staal scored two goals and Ward stopped 18 out of only 19 shots en route to a 4–1 victory. However, Phil Kessel scored two goals and goaltender Tim Thomas stopped all 19 shots to give Boston a 4–0 victory in game five. Thomas then stopped 31 out of 33 shots and Mark Recchi provided an early game winner to help the Bruins win 4–2 in game six. The Hurricanes led game seven after two periods, but Milan Lucic tied the game at 6:19 in the third. However, Scott Walker scored the game-winning goal at 18:46 into the first overtime period to give the Hurricanes a 3–2 victory and the series.

(2) Washington Capitals vs. (4) Pittsburgh Penguins

This was the eighth playoff meeting between these two teams, with the Penguins winning six of the previous seven series. They last met in the 2001 Eastern Conference Quarterfinals, with the Penguins winning in seven games. The Pittsburgh Penguins advanced to their second consecutive Eastern Conference Final after defeating the Washington Capitals, 6–2, in game seven of their Conference Semifinal series. The Capitals appeared to have control of the series after winning the first two games. In game one, Washington goaltender Semyon Varlamov came up with a career-high 34 saves and Tomas Fleischmann provided a decisive third period goal in a 3–2 victory. Then in game two, both the Penguins' Sidney Crosby and the Capitals' Alexander Ovechkin each earned hat tricks, but David Steckel's goal in the second period ultimately made the difference in Washington's 4–3 win. However, Pittsburgh went on to win three consecutive games. Late in the third period of game three, Evgeni Malkin appeared to have the game winning powerplay marker for the Penguins, but Nicklas Backstrom tied the game on a Washington powerplay at 18:10. Kris Letang's game-winning goal at 11:23 into overtime gave the Penguins a 3–2 win. Pittsburgh then erupted to score three goals in the first period of game four, coming from the sticks of Sergei Gonchar, Bill Guerin, and Ruslan Fedotenko, en route to a 5–3 victory. The Penguins also had another overtime victory in game five, with Evgeni Malkin scoring this time on a power play at 3:28 into the extra period for a 4–3 win. The Capitals rebounded in game six with an overtime victory of their own, as David Steckel scored at 6:22 into the extra period to give Washington a 5–4 win.

In the deciding seventh game of the series, Varlamov, who had posted a 2.21 GAA and two shutouts in the playoffs, was pulled in the second period as the Penguins took a 4–0 lead only 2:13 into the second period. At the time that Varlamov was replaced by Jose Theodore, Pittsburgh had outshot Washington 18–5. The Penguins won 6–2 in dominating fashion, picking up a pair of goals from Crosby, to close out the series.

Crosby finished the series with thirteen points—one fewer than Ovechkin's fourteen points, which was the highest single-series point total since the 1995 Stanley Cup playoffs.

Western Conference Semifinals

(2) Detroit Red Wings vs. (8) Anaheim Ducks

The Detroit Red Wings advanced to their third consecutive Western Conference Final, and eighth since 1995, after eliminating the Anaheim Ducks in seven games. This Conference Semifinal match up featured the last two winners of the Stanley Cup, with Anaheim and Detroit winning the Cup in 2007 and 2008 respectively. This also marked the fifth series the two teams faced each other in since their first encounter in 1997. Both teams had won two series' each with the Wings winning in 1997 and 1999, and the Ducks winning in 2003 and 2007.

In game one, Nicklas Lidstrom scored two goals, including the game-winner with about 49 seconds left in regulation to break a 2–2 tie to give the Red Wings the victory. Anaheim's Todd Marchant scored at 1:15 into triple overtime of game two to give the Ducks a 4–3 victory, after goaltender Jonas Hiller stopped 59 Red Wing shots. Game three then ended in controversy: Anaheim was nursing a 2–1 lead with 1:04 remaining in the third period, aided by Hiller's eventual 45 saves and goals from Teemu Selanne and Scott Neidermayer. Detroit's Marian Hossa appeared to have scored the game-tying goal, but referee Brad Watson blew the play dead after losing sight of the puck and the Ducks held on to win the game. Despite the controversial call, the Red Wings bounced back to even the series in game four, with Hossa and Johan Franzen scoring two goals apiece en route to a 6–3 victory. Detroit then went on to win game five, 4–1, with Franzen and Jiri Hudler scoring just 39 seconds apart in the second period to provide the game's first goals. In game six, goaltender Jonas Hiller stopped 38 out of 39 shots as Ryan Getzlaf and Cory Perry each scored to give the Ducks a 2–1 victory. In game seven, Bobby Ryan pulled the Ducks into a 3–3 tie at 7:37 of the third period. However, Red Wings forward Dan Cleary scored the game-winning goal with 3:00 left in regulation after Hiller lost sight of the puck behind him and pushed it over the goal line, to give the Red Wings a 4–3 victory and the series.

(3) Vancouver Canucks vs. (4) Chicago Blackhawks

The Chicago Blackhawks eliminated the Vancouver Canucks in six games, to advance to the Western Conference Final for the first time since 1995. This was just the third time that these two teams faced each other in the playoffs. In 1982, the Canucks eliminated the Blackhawks in five games in the Campbell Conference final, while the Blackhawks won a 1995 conference semifinals series in a four-game sweep.

Sami Salo scored at 18:47 in the third period of game one to break a 3–3 tie, giving the Canucks an eventual 5–3 win. The Blackhawks bounced back in game two, overcoming a 2–0 deficit in the second period to go on to a 6–3 victory, with Patrick Sharp and Dave Bolland scoring two goals each. Vancouver regained the series lead in game three, with goaltender Roberto Luongo stopping 23 out of 24 shots and Steve Bernier providing a powerplay goal to earn a 3–1 victory. However, Chicago went on to win the next three games to close the series. First, Martin Havlat tied game four at 17:16 in the third period and Andrew Ladd scoring at 2:52 into overtime to give the Blackhawks a 2–1 victory. Dustin Byfuglien then scored two goals en route to a 4–2 Chicago win in game five. Finally, the Blackhawks won a high-scoring game six, 7–5, with Patrick Kane earning a hat trick.

Conference Finals

Eastern Conference Final

(4) Pittsburgh Penguins vs. (6) Carolina Hurricanes

This was the first time these two teams met in the playoffs. The Pittsburgh Penguins swept the Carolina Hurricanes in four games, to advance to their second consecutive Stanley Cup Final series. Pittsburgh jumped to a 2–0 lead in the first period of game one, with goals by Miroslav Satan and Evgeni Malkin, before Philippe Boucher added a third period power play goal. Marc-Andre Fleury made a sprawling save on an Eric Staal one-timer in the closing seconds to allow the Penguins to hang on for a 3–2 victory. Game two featured offensive assaults by both teams. Patrick Eaves tied the game for Carolina early in the third period, but Malkin responded by scoring two highlight reel markers to complete a hat trick en route to a 7–4 win. In game three, Malkin had two goals and an assist in a 6–2 victory. Carolina outplayed Pittsburgh for much of game four and got off to a hot start when Staal scored on a wrap around move. However, the Penguins scored four unanswered goals, including a Max Talbot tally that ricocheted strangely off of goaltender Cam Ward to let the Penguins take the lead late in the opening frame, as they picked up a 4–1 win.

Western Conference Final

(2) Detroit Red Wings vs. (4) Chicago Blackhawks

The was the 15th meeting between these two teams in the playoffs, with the Blackhawks winning eight of the previous fourteen series. They last met in the 1995 Western Conference Final, with the Red Wings winning in five games. The Detroit Red Wings eliminated the Chicago Blackhawks in five games again, to advance to their second consecutive Stanley Cup Final series. Three of the five games in the series were decided in overtime. Dan Cleary scored two goals en route to a 5–2 Detroit victory in game one. In game two, Jonathan Toews scored two Chicago goals, including one that tied the game at 12:20 in the third period. However, Mikael Samuelsson scored at 5:14 into overtime to give the Red Wings a 3–2 win. Chicago bounced back in game three with a 4–3 win of Patrick Sharp's overtime goal at 1:52 into the extra period. The Blackhawks took an early 3–0 lead in the game but saw Detroit bounce back with three goals from defencemen in the second period. During the game, Blackhawks goaltender Nikolai Khabibulin was injured and replaced for the third period and overtime by Cristobal Huet. The game also featured a controversial hit from Nicklas Kronwall that injured star Chicago winger Martin Havlat. Detroit dominated game four, winning 6–1, with Marian Hossa and Henrik Zetterberg each tallying a pair of goals. Game five was an exhibition in goaltending with Chris Osgood and Cristobal Huet each making a variety of spectacular saves. However, Darren Helm proved to be the eventual hero, scoring at 3:58 into overtime to give the Red Wings a 2–1 win and the series.  This was the last Western Conference Final series to be played entirely outside of California until 2018.

Stanley Cup Finals

This was the second playoff meeting between these two teams and a rematch of the previous year's Stanley Cup Finals which Detroit won in six games. This was the first time since 1983 and 1984 that same teams met in consecutive finals. This was Detroit's twenty-fourth Finals appearance; while Pittsburgh made their fourth appearance in the Finals. The teams split their two-game regular season series.

Player statistics

Skaters
These are the top ten skaters based on points. If the list exceeds ten skaters because of a tie in points, all of the tied skaters are shown.

GP = Games played; G = Goals; A = Assists; Pts = Points; +/– = Plus/minus; PIM = Penalty minutes

Goaltending
This is a combined table of the top five goaltenders based on goals against average and the top five goaltenders based on save percentage with at least 420 minutes played. The table is sorted by GAA, and the criteria for inclusion is bolded.

GP = Games played; W = Wins; L = Losses; SA = Shots against; GA = Goals against; GAA = Goals against average; SV% = Save percentage; SO = Shutouts; TOI = Time on ice (minutes:seconds)

Television

National Canadian English-language coverage of the playoffs were split between the CBC and TSN, with the CBC holding exclusive rights to the Stanley Cup Finals. French-language telecasts were broadcast on RDS and RDS2. This was the first postseason that the CBC and TSN selected the rights to individual series in the first three rounds using a draft-like setup. The CBC had first, second, fourth, and sixth choices of first-round series; first and third in the second round, and first in the Conference Finals. TSN then had third, fifth, seventh, and eighth choices of first-round series; second and fourth in the second round; and second in the Conference Finals. These changes also allowed TSN to broadcast playoff games involving Canadian teams for the first time, removing the CBC's exclusivity on them.

In the United States, coverage was split between NBC and Versus. During the first three rounds, NBC primarily televised weekend afternoon games and Versus aired evening games. During the first and second round, excluding games exclusively broadcast on NBC, the regional rights holders of each participating U.S. team produced local telecasts of their respective games. Not all first and second-round games were nationally televised, while the Conference Finals were exclusively broadcast on either NBC or Versus. NBC then aired the first two and final three games of the Stanley Cup Finals, while Versus broadcast games three and four.

See also
2008–09 NHL season
List of NHL seasons

References

External links
2009 Stanley Cup playoffs at ESPN
2009 Stanley Cup playoffs at Hockey Reference

playoffs
Stanley Cup playoffs